Loculla rauca is a wolf spider species of the family Lycosidae endemic to São Tomé Island. It was first described in 1910 by Eugène Simon.

Its female holotype measures 16 mm. The subspecies Loculla rauca minor only measures 8-10 mm.

References

Endemic fauna of São Tomé Island
Lycosidae
Spiders of Africa
Spiders described in 1910

fr:Leucauge argenteanigra